Genervon Biopharmaceuticals is a pharmaceutical company based in Pasadena, CA, focused on creating drugs for diseases of the central human nervous system. It is best known for its experimental drug, GM604, which seeks to treat Amyotrophic lateral sclerosis (ALS), also known as Lou Gehrig's disease.

GM604
GM604 is the temporary name of a drug under development by Genervon that is supposed to slow the progression of ALS. The drug is currently in the Phase II approval process of the FDA after a 12-week clinical trial was performed on 12 patients. Genervon has claimed that the trial revealed that treatment with GM604 resulted in a statistically significant and robust slow down in the progression of the disease. The results of this trial encouraged ALS support groups and patients to petition Congress and the FDA to speed up approval of the drug, with a petition on Change.org receiving nearly 800,000 signatures.

Despite Genervon's claims, experts in the industry such as Steve Perrin, the chief executive officer of the ALS Therapy Development Institute, and John Carroll of Fiercebiotech.com have challenged the significance of the trial, specifically objecting to the small number of patients in the early-phase trial, and cautioned that an accelerated approval process seems premature.

On May 30, 2016, European Commission approved and implemented the decision relating to the designation of "GM604" as an orphan medicinal product under Regulation (EC) No 141/2000 of the European Parliament and of the Council.

Current drug development
While Genervon has not yet released any drugs for the market, it is in the process of developing three drugs for which it has submitted Investigational New Drug applications which are in Phase II trials. These drugs seek to treat acute ischemic stroke patients under (IND #77789), Parkinson's disease (IND #10944) and ALS (GM604, IND #118420).

External links
Genervon Website

References

Pharmaceutical companies of the United States
Health care companies based in California